Santha Rama Rau (24 January 1923 – 21 April 2009) was an Indian-born American writer.

Early life and background

While Santha's father was a Chitrapur Saraswat Brahmin from Canara whose mother-tongue was Konkani, her mother was a Kashmiri Brahmin from the far north of India, who had however grown up in Hubli.

In her early years, Rama Rau lived in an India under British rule. When aged 5 and a half, with her 8-year-old sister Premila, she briefly attended an Anglo-Indian School where the teacher anglicized their names. Santha's name was changed to Cynthia and her sister's was changed to Pamela. The environment there they found to be condescending, as their teacher told them that "Indians cheat". They walked home, and never returned to that school. The incident was recounted in Rama Rau's short memoir entitled "By Any Other Name".

Career
When India won its independence in 1947, Rama Rau's father was appointed as his nation's first ambassador to Japan. While in Tokyo, Japan, she met her future husband, an American, Faubion Bowers. After extensive traveling through Asia and a bit of Africa and Europe, the couple settled in New York City, New York. Rama Rau became an instructor in the English language  faculty of Sarah Lawrence College, Bronxville, New York, in 1971, also working as a freelance writer.

She adapted the novel A Passage to India, with author E. M. Forster’s approval, for the theater. The play of the same name was produced for the Oxford Playhouse, Oxford, United Kingdom, moved to the West End in London, United Kingdom, in 1960 for 261 performances, and then on to Broadway in New York City where it was staged 109 times. It was adapted by John Maynard and directed by Waris Hussein for BBC television's Play of the Month in 1965. Although the film rights originally required Rama Rau to write the screenplay, director David Lean found her draft unsatisfactory and was able to reject it, although she is still credited in the titles because he still used some of her dialogue.

Rama Rau is the author of Home to India, East of Home, This is India, Remember the House (a novel), My Russian Journey, Gifts of Passage, The Adventuress, (a novel),  View to the Southeast, and An Inheritance, as well as co-author (with Gayatri Devi) of A Princess Remembers: the memoirs of the Maharani of Jaipur.

Private life
She married Faubion Bowers in 1951 and had one son, Jai Peter Bowers in 1952. The couple divorced in 1966.  In 1970, Rama Rau married Gurdon B. Wattles, and had no children. Faubion Bowers died in November 1999.

References

Mukherjee, Durba and Sayan Chattopadhyay. "Passage through India: self-fashioning in Santha Rama Rau's Indian Travel Writings." Studies in Travel Writings 24 (4), 366 - 384: 2020. <https://doi.org/10.1080/13645145.2021.1946735>

1923 births
2009 deaths
20th-century Indian novelists
20th-century Indian women writers
20th-century American women writers
American dramatists and playwrights of Indian descent
American Hindus
American women writers of Indian descent
Dramatists and playwrights from Tamil Nadu
Indian emigrants to the United States
Indian women novelists
Novelists from Tamil Nadu
Sarah Lawrence College faculty
Wellesley College alumni
Women writers from Tamil Nadu
Writers from Chennai
American women academics
21st-century American women